This is a list of places in England which have standing links to local communities in other countries known as "town twinning" (usually in Europe) or "sister cities" (usually in the rest of the world).

A
Abingdon-on-Thames

 Argentan, France
 Lucca, Italy
 Schongau, Germany
 Sint-Niklaas, Belgium

Adur

 Riom, France
 Żywiec, Poland

Alnwick

 Lagny-sur-Marne, France
 Time, Norway
 Voerde, Germany

Alton

 Montecchio Maggiore, Italy
 Pertuis, France

Alveston
 Courville-sur-Eure, France

Amber Valley

 Blackstone Valley, United States	
 Głogów, Poland
 Laholm, Sweden

Amersham

 Bensheim, Germany
 Krynica-Zdrój, Poland

Andover

 Andover, United States
 Goch, Germany
 Redon, France

Ashby-de-la-Zouch

 Evans, United States
 Pithiviers, France

Ashford

 Bad Münstereifel, Germany
 Fougères, France
 Hopewell, United States

Ashington
 Remscheid, Germany

Ashton-under-Lyne
 Chaumont, France

Aylesbury
 Bourg-en-Bresse, France

B

Ba
Baldock

 Eisenberg, Germany
 Sanvignes-les-Mines, France

Banbury

 Ermont, France
 Hennef, Germany

Barking and Dagenham

 Tczew, Poland
 Witten, Germany

Barnet

 Chaville, France
 Jinja, Uganda
 Montclair, United States
 Morphou, Cyprus
 Le Raincy, France
 Ramat Gan, Israel
 Siegen-Wittgenstein (district), Germany
 Tempelhof-Schöneberg (Berlin), Germany

Barnsley

 Horlivka, Ukraine
 Schwäbisch Gmünd, Germany

Barnstaple

 Barnstable, United States
 Harstad, Norway
 Susa, Italy
 Trouville-sur-Mer, France
 Uelzen, Germany

Barrow upon Soar
 Marans, France

Basildon

 Heiligenhaus, Germany
 Meaux, France

Basingstoke and Deane

 Alençon, France
 Braine-l'Alleud, Belgium
 Euskirchen, Germany

Bassetlaw

 Aurillac, France
 Farmers Branch, United States
 Garbsen, Germany
 Pfungstadt, Germany

Bath

 Aix-en-Provence, France
 Alkmaar, Netherlands
 Beppu, Japan 
 Braunschweig, Germany
 Kaposvár, Hungary
 Northern Beaches, Australia

Batheaston
 Oudon, France

Bathford
 Artannes-sur-Indre, France

Battle
 Saint-Valery-sur-Somme, France

Be–Bo
Beaminster
 Saint-James, France

Beccles
 Petit-Couronne, France

Bedford

 Bamberg, Germany
 Rovigo, Italy
 Włocławek, Poland

Belper
 Pawtucket, United States

Beverley

 Lemgo, Germany
 Nogent-sur-Oise, France

Bewdley

 Fort-Mahon-Plage, France
 Vellmar, Germany

Bexley

 Arnsberg, Germany
 Évry-Courcouronnes, France

Biddulph
 Fusignano, Italy

Bideford

 Landivisiau, France
 Manteo, United States

Biggleswade
 Erlensee, Germany

Bilbrook
 Saint-Pryvé-Saint-Mesmin, France

Billericay

 Billerica, United States
 Chauvigny, France
 Fishers, United States

Birchington-on-Sea
 La Chapelle-d'Armentières, France

Birmingham

 Chicago, United States
 Frankfurt am Main, Germany
 Guangzhou, China
 Johannesburg, South Africa
 Leipzig, Germany
 Lyon, France
 Milan, Italy
 Zaporizhzhia, Ukraine

Birstall
 Rixensart, Belgium

Blackburn

 Altena, Germany
 Péronne, France
 Tarnów, Poland

Blackpool

 Bottrop, Germany
 Sanya, China

Blyth
 Solingen, Germany

Bodmin

 Bad Bederkesa (Geestland), Germany
 Grass Valley, United States
 Le Relecq-Kerhuon, France

Bognor Regis

 Saint-Maur-des-Fossés, France
 Trebbin, Germany
 Weil am Rhein, Germany

Bolton

 Le Mans, France
 Paderborn, Germany

Bournemouth

 Lucerne, Switzerland
 Netanya, Israel

Br
Brackley

 Montabaur, Germany
 Les Pavillons-sous-Bois, France

Bracknell
 Leverkusen, Germany

Bradford

 Galway, Ireland
 Hamm, Germany
 Mönchengladbach, Germany
 Roubaix, France
 Skopje, North Macedonia
 Verviers, Belgium

Bradley Stoke
 Champs-sur-Marne, France

Brampton

 Berry-Bouy, France
 Marmagne, France

Brent
 South Dublin, Ireland

Brentwood

 Montbazon, France
 Roth (district), Germany

Bridgnorth

 Schrobenhausen, Germany
 Thiers, France

Bridgwater

 La Ciotat, France
 Homberg, Germany
 Marsa, Malta
 Uherské Hradiště, Czech Republic

Bridlington

 Bad Salzuflen, Germany
 Millau, France

Bridport 
 Saint-Vaast-la-Hougue, France

Brighouse
 Lüdenscheid, Germany

Bristol

 Beira, Mozambique
 Bordeaux, France
 Guangzhou, China
 Hanover, Germany
 Porto, Portugal
 Puerto Morazán, Nicaragua
 Tbilisi, Georgia

Broadstairs and St Peter's
 Wattignies, France

Bromley
 Neuwied, Germany

Bromsgrove

 Gronau, Germany
 Saint-Sauveur-Lendelin, France

Broxtowe 
 Gütersloh, Germany

Bu
Buckingham

 Mouvaux, France
 Neukirchen-Vluyn, Germany

Bude-Stratton
 Ergué-Gabéric, France

Buntingford

 Luynes, France
 Ólvega, Spain

Burgess Hill

 Abbeville, France
 Schmallenberg, Germany

Burham
 L'Épine, France

Burnley
 Vitry-sur-Seine, France

Burton Latimer
 Altendiez, Germany

Burton upon Trent

 Elkhart, United States
 Lingen, Germany

Bury

 Angoulême, France
 Datong, China
 Schorndorf, Germany
 Tulle, France
 Woodbury, United States

Bury St Edmunds

 Compiègne, France
 Kevelaer, Germany

Buxton

 Bad Nauheim, Germany
 Oignies, France

C

Ca
Calderdale

 Mayo, Ireland
 Musoma, Tanzania
 Strakonice, Czech Republic

Callington

 Barsbüttel, Germany
 Guipavas, France

Calne

 Caln Township, United States
 Charlieu, France
 Eningen unter Achalm, Germany

Calstock
 Saint-Thuriau, France

Camborne
 Sainte-Anne-d'Auray, France

Cambridge

 Heidelberg, Germany
 Szeged, Hungary

Cannock Chase

 Datteln, Germany
 Western Springs, United States

Canterbury

 Bloomington, United States
 Esztergom, Hungary
 Mölndal, Sweden
 Normal, United States
 Reims, France

 Vladimir, Russia

Carlisle

 Flensburg, Germany
 Słupsk, Poland

Cawsand
 Porspoder, France

Ch
Chard

 Helmstedt, Germany
 Morangis, France
 Șeica Mare, Romania

Cheddar

 Felsberg, Germany
 Vernouillet, France

Chelmsford

 Annonay, France
 Backnang, Germany
 Wuxi, China

Cheltenham

 Annecy, France
 Cheltenham, United States
 Göttingen, Germany

 Weihai, China

Chesham

 Archena, Spain
 Friedrichsdorf, Germany
 Houilles, France

Chester

 Lörrach, Germany
 Senigallia, Italy
 Sens, France

Chesterfield

 Darmstadt, Germany
 Troyes, France
 Tsumeb, Namibia
 Yangquan, China

Chichester

 Chartres, France
 Ravenna, Italy

Chipping Sodbury
 Cesson, France

Christchurch

 Aalen, Germany
 Christchurch, New Zealand
 Saint-Lô, France
 Tatabánya, Hungary

Ci–Cr
Cirencester

 Itzehoe, Germany
 Saint-Genis-Laval, France

Cleethorpes
 Königswinter, Germany

Clevedon

 Épernay, France
 Ettlingen, Germany
 Middelkerke, Belgium

Coalville
 Romans-sur-Isère, France

Cockermouth
 Marvejols, France

Codsall
 Saint-Pryvé-Saint-Mesmin, France

Colchester

 Avignon, France
 Imola, Italy
 Wetzlar, Germany
 Yangzhou, China

Coleshill
 Chassieu, France

Colney Heath
 Boissy-sous-Saint-Yon, France

Congleton
 Trappes, France

Coniston

 Fonteno, Italy
 Illiers-Combray, France
 Riva di Solto, Italy
 Solto Collina, Italy

Constantine
 Pont-Croix, France

Corby

 Châtellerault, France
 Shijiazhuang, China
 Velbert, Germany

Corsham
 Jargeau, France

Coventry

 Arnhem, Netherlands
 Belgrade, Serbia
 Bologna, Italy
 Cork, Ireland
 Cornwall, Canada
 Coventry, Connecticut, United States
 Coventry, New York, United States
 Coventry, Rhode Island, United States
 Dresden, Germany
 Galați, Romania
 Granby, Canada
 Graz, Austria
 Jinan, China
 Kecskemét, Hungary
 Kiel, Germany
 Kingston, Jamaica
 Lidice, Czech Republic
 Ostrava, Czech Republic
 Parkes, Australia
 Saint-Étienne, France
 Sarajevo, Bosnia and Herzegovina
 Windsor, Canada

Crawley
 Dorsten, Germany

Crewe

 Bischofsheim, Germany
 Dzierżoniów, Poland
 Mâcon, France

Crowborough

 Horwich, England, United Kingdom
 Montargis, France

Croydon
 Arnhem, Netherlands

D
Dacorum
 Neu-Isenburg, Germany

Dalton-in-Furness
 Dalton, United States

Darley Dale
 Veuzain-sur-Loire, France

Darlington

 Amiens, France
 Mülheim an der Ruhr, Germany

Dartford

 Gravelines, France
 Hanau, Germany
 Namyangju, South Korea
 Tallinn, Estonia

Denton

 Kierspe, Germany
 Montigny-le-Bretonneux, France

Derby
 Osnabrück, Germany

Derbyshire

 Toyota, Japan
 Yangpu (Shanghai), China

Desborough is a member of the Charter of European Rural Communities, a town twinning association across the European Union. Desborough also has one other twin town.

Charter of European Rural Communities
 Bienvenida, Spain
 Bièvre, Belgium
 Bucine, Italy
 Cashel, Ireland
 Cissé, France
 Esch (Haaren), Netherlands
 Hepstedt, Germany
 Ibănești, Romania
 Kandava (Tukums), Latvia
 Kannus, Finland
 Kolindros, Greece
 Lassee, Austria
 Medzev, Slovakia
 Moravče, Slovenia
 Næstved, Denmark
 Nagycenk, Hungary
 Nadur, Malta
 Ockelbo, Sweden
 Pano Lefkara, Cyprus
 Põlva, Estonia
 Samuel (Soure), Portugal
 Slivo Pole, Bulgaria
 Starý Poddvorov, Czech Republic
 Strzyżów, Poland
 Tisno, Croatia
 Troisvierges, Luxembourg
 Žagarė (Joniškis), Lithuania
Other
 Neuville-de-Poitou, France

Devizes

 Mayenne, France
 Oamaru (Waitaki), New Zealand
 Tornio, Finland
 Waiblingen, Germany

Didcot

 Meylan, France
 Planegg, Germany

Ditton
 Rang-du-Fliers, France

Doncaster

 Camden, England, United Kingdom
 Gliwice, Poland
 Herten, Germany
 Wilmington, United States

Dorchester

 Bayeux, France
 Lübbecke, Germany

Dover

 Calais, France
 Split, Croatia

Drayton
 Lesparre-Médoc, France

Droitwich Spa 

 Bad Ems, Germany
 Voiron, France

Dronfield
 Sindelfingen, Germany

Droylsden
 Villemomble, France

Dukinfield
 Champagnole, France

Dunstable

 Bourgoin-Jallieu, France
 Porz (Cologne), Germany

Durham

 Alcalá de Guadaíra, Spain
 Banská Bystrica, Slovakia
 Durham, United States
 Jász-Nagykun-Szolnok County, Hungary
 Nakskov (Lolland), Denmark
 Somme, France
 Tübingen, Germany
 Wesel (district), Germany

Dursley
 Bovenden, Germany

E
Ealing

 Bielany (Warsaw), Poland
 Marcq-en-Barœul, France
 Steinfurt (district), Germany

East Bergholt
 Barbizon, France

East Cambridgeshire
 Kempen, Germany

East Grinstead

 Bourg-de-Péage, France
 Mindelheim, Germany
 Sant Feliu de Guíxols, Spain
 Schwaz, Austria
 Verbania, Italy

East Hendred
 Sarceaux, France

East Hoathly with Halland
 Juziers, France

East Sussex

 Essonne, France
 Pinneberg (district), Germany

Eastleigh

 Kornwestheim, Germany
 Temple Terrace, United States
 Villeneuve-Saint-Georges, France

Eastwood
 Szolnok, Hungary

Edenbridge
 Mont-Saint-Aignan, France

Elland
 Riorges, France

Ellesmere Port
 Reutlingen, Germany

Elstree and Borehamwood

 Fontenay-aux-Roses, France
 Offenburg, Germany

Ely
 Esbjerg, Denmark 

Enfield

 Chalandri, Greece
 Courbevoie, France
 Gladbeck, Germany
 Sarıyer, Turkey

Epsom and Ewell
 Chantilly, France

Evesham

 Dreux, France
 Evesham, United States
 Melsungen, Germany

Exeter

 Bad Homburg vor der Höhe, Germany
 Rennes, France
 Terracina, Italy

Eye
 Pouzauges, France

F
Falmouth

 Douarnenez, France
 Rotenburg (district), Germany

Fareham

 Pulheim, Germany
 Vannes, France

Faringdon
 Le Mêle-sur-Sarthe, France

Farnham
 Andernach, Germany

Faversham
 Hazebrouck, France

Felixstowe

 Salzwedel, Germany
 Wesel, Germany

Fenland

 Nettetal, Germany
 Sunshine Coast, Australia

Feock
 Hôpital-Camfrout, France

Filton

 Saint-Vallier, France
 Witzenhausen, Germany

Folkestone

 Boulogne-sur-Mer, France
 Étaples, France

Fordingbridge
 Vimoutiers, France

Forest Row
 Milly-la-Forêt, France

Frome

 Château-Gontier, France
 Murrhardt, Germany
 Rabka-Zdrój, Poland

G
Gateshead

 Komatsu, Japan
 Saint-Étienne-du-Rouvray, France

Glastonbury

 Lalibela, Ethiopia
 Patmos, Greece

Glossop
 Bad Vilbel, Germany

Gloucester

 Metz, France
 Trier, Germany

Godalming

 Joigny, France
 Mayen, Germany

Godmanchester

 Gubbio, Italy
 Salon-de-Provence, France
 Szentendre, Hungary
 Wertheim, Germany

Grantham
 Sankt Augustin, Germany

Gravesham

 Cambrai, France
 Chesterfield County, United States
 Jalandhar, India
 Neumünster, Germany

Great Shelford
 Verneuil-en-Halatte, France

Great Yarmouth
 Rambouillet, France

Greenwich

 Maribor, Slovenia
 Reinickendorf (Berlin), Germany
 Tema, Ghana

Grendon
 Bois-Bernard, France

Grove
 Mably, France

Guildford
 Freiburg im Breisgau, Germany

H

Ha
Hackney

 Austin, United States
 Haifa, Israel
 St. George's, Grenada
 Suresnes, France

Hadleigh
 Rousies, France

Hailsham
 Gournay-en-Bray, France

Halesworth

 Bouchain, France
 Eitorf, Germany

Halifax
 Aachen, Germany

Halton

 Leiria, Portugal
 Marzahn-Hellersdorf (Berlin), Germany
 Tongling, China
 Ústí nad Labem, Czech Republic

Hammersmith and Fulham

 Anderlecht, Belgium
 Boulogne-Billancourt, France
 Montefiore Conca, Italy
 Neukölln (Berlin), Germany
 Zaanstad, Netherlands

Haringey

 Arima, Trinidad and Tobago
 Clarendon, Jamaica
 Koblenz, Germany
 Larnaca, Cyprus
 Livry-Gargan, France

Harlow

 Havířov, Czech Republic
 Tingalpa (Brisbane), Australia
 Vélizy-Villacoublay, France

Harpenden

 Alzey, Germany
 Cosne-Cours-sur-Loire, France

Harrogate

 Bagnères-de-Luchon, France
 Barrie, Canada
 Montecatini Terme, Italy
 Wellington, New Zealand

Harrow
 Douai, France

Hartlepool

 Hückelhoven, Germany
 Muskegon, United States

 Sliema, Malta

Hastings

 Béthune, France
 Dordrecht, Netherlands
 Oudenaarde, Belgium
 Schwerte, Germany

Hatfield
 Merksplas, Belgium

Haverhill

 Ehringshausen, Germany
 Pont-Saint-Esprit, France

Havering

 Hesdin, France
 Ludwigshafen am Rhein, Germany

Haworth
 Aguas Calientes, Peru

Haywards Heath

 Bondues, France
 Traunstein, Germany

He
Heathfield and Waldron
 Forges-les-Eaux, France

Hebden Royd

 Saint-Pol-sur-Ternoise, France
 Warstein, Germany

Helston

 Pleumeur-Bodou, France
 Port Augusta, Australia
 Sasso Marconi, Italy

Henley-on-Thames

 Bled, Slovenia
 Falaise, France
 Leichlingen, Germany

Hereford

 Dillenburg, Germany
 Jaworzno, Poland
 Vierzon, France

Herne Bay

 Waltrop, Germany
 Wimereux, France

Hertford

 Évron, France
 Wildeshausen, Germany

Hessle
 Thizy-les-Bourgs, France

Hi–Hy
High Wycombe
 Kelkheim, Germany

Higham Ferrers
 Hachenburg, Germany

Hillingdon

 Mantes-la-Jolie, France
 Schleswig, Germany

Hinckley

 Le Grand-Quevilly, France
 Herford, Germany

Hitchin

 Bingen am Rhein, Germany
 Nuits-Saint-Georges, France

Horndean
 Aubergenville, France

Horsham

 Lage, Germany
 Saint-Maixent-l'École, France

Hounslow

 Issy-les-Moulineaux, France
 Jalandhar, India
 Lahore, Pakistan
 Ramallah, Palestine

Huntingdon

 Gubbio, Italy
 Salon-de-Provence, France
 Szentendre, Hungary
 Wertheim, Germany

Hurst Green
 Ellerhoop, Germany

Hythe

 Berck, France
 Poperinge, Belgium

I
Ilkeston
 Châlons-en-Champagne, France

Ilkley
 Coutances, France

Ipswich
 Arras, France

Irchester
 Coulon, France

Isle of Portland

 Holzwickede, Germany
 Louviers, France

Isle of Wight
 Coburg, Germany

K
Kegworth

 Bihorel, France
 Bois-Guillaume, France
 Bosc-Guérard-Saint-Adrien, France
 Isneauville, France
 Fontaine-le-Bourg, France
 Ry, France

Keighley

 Manzini, Eswatini
 Myrtle Beach, United States
 Poix-du-Nord, France

Kendal

 Killarney, Ireland
 Rinteln, Germany

Kenilworth

 Bourg-la-Reine, France
 Eppstein, Germany

Kensington and Chelsea
 Cannes, France

Kenton

 Linkebeek, Belgium
 Val-du-Layon, France

Kettering

 Kettering, United States
 Lahnstein, Germany

Keynsham
 Libourne, France

Kidderminster
 Husum, Germany

Kidsgrove
 Saint-Paul-du-Bois, France

Kingsbridge
 Weilerbach, Germany

Kingston upon Hull

 Freetown, Sierra Leone
 Niigata, Japan
 Raleigh, United States

 Szczecin, Poland

Kingston upon Thames

 Gwanak (Seoul), South Korea
 Jaffna, Sri Lanka
 Oldenburg, Germany

Kington
 Marines, France

King's Lynn
 Emmerich am Rhein, Germany

Kirkby-in-Ashfield
 Ronchin, France

Kirklees

 Besançon, France
 Bielsko-Biała, Poland
 Kostanay, Kazakhstan
 Unna (district), Germany

Knowsley
 Moers, Germany

Knutsford
 Montmorency, France

L

La–Le
Lambeth

 Brooklyn (New York), United States
 Vincennes, France

Lancaster

 Aalborg, Denmark 
 Lublin, Poland 
 Perpignan, France 
 Rendsburg, Germany
 Växjö, Sweden

Launceston

 Achim (Börßum), Germany

 Plestin-les-Grèves, France

Ledbury
 Strömstad, Sweden

Leeds

 Brno, Czech Republic
 Dortmund, Germany
 Durban, South Africa
 Hangzhou, China
 Lille, France
 Siegen, Germany

Leek
 Este, Italy

Leicester

 Chongqing, China
 Haskovo, Bulgaria
 Krefeld, Germany
 Masaya, Nicaragua
 Rajkot, India
 Strasbourg, France

Leighton–Linslade

 Coulommiers, France
 Titisee-Neustadt, Germany

Leominster
 Saverne, France

Letchworth Garden City

 Chagny, France
 Kristiansand, Norway
 Wissen, Germany

Lewes

 Blois, France
 Waldshut-Tiengen, Germany

Lewisham

 Antony, France
 Charlottenburg-Wilmersdorf (Berlin), Germany
 Matagalpa, Nicaragua

Li
Lichfield

 Limburg an der Lahn, Germany 
 Sainte-Foy-lès-Lyon, France

Lincoln

 Neustadt an der Weinstraße, Germany
 Port Lincoln, Australia
 Radomsko, Poland
 Nanchang, China
 Tangshan, China

Liskeard
 Quimperlé, France

Little Shelford
 Verneuil-en-Halatte, France

Littlehampton

 Chennevières-sur-Marne, France
 Durmersheim, Germany

Littlethorpe
 Genappe, Belgium

Liverpool

 Birmingham, United States
 Cologne, Germany
 Dublin, Ireland
 Odesa, Ukraine
 Panama City, Panama
 Rio de Janeiro, Brazil
 Shanghai, China
 Surabaya, Indonesia

Lizard
 Landévennec, France

Lo–Ly
London

 Beijing, China
 Berlin, Germany
 Bogotá, Colombia
 Kuala Lumpur, Malaysia
 Moscow, Russia
 New York City, United States
 Santiago, Chile
 Shanghai, China
 Tehran, Iran
 Tokyo, Japan

Long Eaton

 Langen, Germany
 Romorantin-Lanthenay, France

Longdendale
 Ruppichteroth, Germany

Looe
 Quiberon, France

Lostwithiel
 Pleyber-Christ, France

Loughborough

 Épinal, France
 Gembloux, Belgium
 Schwäbisch Hall, Germany
 Zamość, Poland

Lowestoft
 Plaisir, France

Ludlow

 La Ferté-Macé, France
 Narberth, Wales, United Kingdom
 San Pietro in Cariano, Italy

Luton

 Bergisch Gladbach, Germany
 Eskilstuna, Sweden
 Spandau (Berlin), Germany

Lyme Regis

 Barfleur, France
 Jamestown, United States
 St. George's, Bermuda

Lymington

 Almansa, Spain
 Mosbach, Germany
 Vitré, Ille-et-Vilaine, France

Lytham St Annes

 Caudry, France
 Werne, Germany

M
Mabe
 Primelin, France

Maldon

 Cuijk, Netherlands
 Villeparisis, France

Malvern

 Bagnères-de-Bigorre, France
 Mariánské Lázně, Czech Republic

Manchester

 Chemnitz, Germany
 Wuhan, China

Mansfield

 Heiligenhaus, Germany
 Mansfield, Massachusetts, United States
 Mansfield, Ohio, United States
 Stryi, Ukraine

March
 Saint-Jean-de-Braye, France

Margate

 Idar-Oberstein, Germany
 Les Mureaux, France
 Yalta, Ukraine

Marlow

 Budavár (Budapest), Hungary
 Marly-le-Roi, France

Matlock
 Eaubonne, France

Medway

 Cádiz, Spain
 Chancheng (Foshan), China
 Itō, Japan
 Valenciennes, France
 Yokosuka, Japan

Merton
 Irving, United States

Middlesbrough

 Dunkirk, France
 Oberhausen, Germany

Midsomer Norton
 Ambarès-et-Lagrave, France

Mildenhall
 Luc-sur-Mer, France

Mossley
 Hem, France

Much Wenlock
 Cysoing, France

N
Nantwich

 Bischofsheim, Germany
 Dzierżoniów, Poland
 Mâcon, France

Narborough
 Genappe, Belgium

Newark-on-Trent

 Emmendingen, Germany
 Saint-Cyr-Sur-Loire, France
 Sandomierz, Poland

Newburgh
 Newburgh, United States

Newbury

 Bagnols-sur-Cèze, France
 Braunfels, Germany
 Carcaixent, Spain
 Eeklo, Belgium
 Feltre, Italy

Newcastle upon Tyne

 Atlanta, United States
 Bergen, Norway
 Gelsenkirchen, Germany
 Groningen, Netherlands
 Haifa, Israel
 Little Rock, United States
 Nancy, France
 Newcastle, Australia
 Taiyuan, China

Newham
 Kaiserslautern, Germany

Newhaven
 La Chapelle-Saint-Mesmin, France

Newick
 Itteville, France

Newmarket

 Lexington, United States
 Maisons-Laffitte, France
 Le Mesnil-le-Roi, France

Newquay
 Dinard, France

Newton Abbot

 Aÿ-Champagne, France
 Besigheim, Germany

North East Derbyshire
 Darmstadt-Dieburg (district), Germany

North Tyneside

 Halluin, France
 Klaipėda, Lithuania
 Mönchengladbach, Germany
 Oer-Erkenschwick, Germany

Northampton

 Marburg, Germany
 Poitiers, France

Northiam
 Calonne-sur-la-Lys, France

Norwich

 Koblenz, Germany
 Novi Sad, Serbia
 Rouen, France
 El Viejo, Nicaragua

Nottingham

 Ghent, Belgium
 Harare, Zimbabwe
 Karlsruhe, Germany

 Ningbo, China
 Timișoara, Romania
 Września, Poland

Nuneaton and Bedworth

 Cottbus, Germany
 Guadalajara, Spain
 Roanne, France

O
Oadby and Wigston

 Maromme, France
 Norderstedt, Germany

Oakham

 Barmstedt, Germany
 Dodgeville, United States

Oldham
 Kranj, Slovenia

Olveston
 Bréhan, France

Oswestry
 Combs-la-Ville, France

Oxford

 Bonn (Bonn), Germany
 Grenoble, France
 Leiden, Netherlands
 León, Nicaragua
 Padua, Italy

 Ramallah, Palestine
 Wrocław, Poland

P
Patchway
 Gauting, Germany

Peacehaven

 Épinay-sous-Sénart, France
 Isernhagen, Germany

Pendle

 Creil, France
 Marl, Germany

Penistone
 Grindavík, Iceland

Penrith
 Penrith, Australia

Penryn
 Audierne, France

Penzance

 Concarneau, France
 Cuxhaven, Germany
 Greater Bendigo, Australia
 Nevada City, United States

Peterborough

 Alcalá de Henares, Spain
 Bourges, France
 Forlì, Italy
 Viersen, Germany
 Vinnytsia, Ukraine

Peterlee
 Nordenham, Germany

Petersfield

 Barentin, France
 Warendorf, Germany

Plymouth

 Brest, France
 Gdynia, Poland

 Plymouth, United States
 San Sebastián, Spain

Polegate

 Appen, Germany
 Saintry-sur-Seine, France

Poole
 Cherbourg-en-Cotentin, France

Porthleven
 Guissény, France

Portsmouth

 Caen, France
 Duisburg, Germany
 Haifa, Israel
 Maizuru, Japan
 Portsmouth, United States
 Sydney, Australia

Potters Bar

 Franconville, France
 Viernheim, Germany

Poynton

 Érd, Hungary
 Haybes, France

Preston

 Almelo, Netherlands
 Kalisz, Poland
 Nîmes, France
 Recklinghausen, Germany

Pucklechurch
 Pringy, France

R
Radcliffe-on-Trent
 Bussy-Saint-Georges, France

Ramsgate

 Chimay, Belgium
 Conflans-Sainte-Honorine, France
 Frederikssund, Denmark

Reading

 Clonmel, Ireland
 Düsseldorf, Germany
 San Francisco Libre, Nicaragua
 Speightstown, Barbados

Redcar and Cleveland
 Troisdorf, Germany

Redditch

 Auxerre, France
 Gruchet-le-Valasse, France
 Gujar Khan, Pakistan
 Mtwara, Tanzania
 Saint Elizabeth, Jamaica

Redruth

 Mineral del Monte, Mexico
 Mineral Point, United States
 Plumergat, France

Reigate and Banstead

 Brunoy, France
 Eschweiler, Germany

Richmond upon Thames

 Fontainebleau, France
 Konstanz, Germany
 Richmond, United States

Ringwood
 Pont-Audemer, France

Rochdale

 Bielefeld, Germany
 Lviv, Ukraine
 Sahiwal, Pakistan
 Tourcoing, France

Romsey

 Battenberg, Germany
 Paimpol, France
 Treviglio, Italy

Rossendale
 Bocholt, Germany

Rotherfield
 Saint-Chéron, France

Rotherham

 Cluj-Napoca, Romania
 Riesa, Germany
 Saint-Quentin, France
 Zabrze, Poland

Rothwell
 Droué, France

Royal Leamington Spa

 Brühl, Germany
 Heemstede, Netherlands
 Sceaux, France

Rugby

 Évreux, France
 Rüsselsheim am Main, Germany

Runnymede

 Bergisch Gladbach, Germany
 Herndon, United States
 Joinville-le-Pont, France

Rushmoor

 Dayton, United States
 Gorkha, Nepal
 Meudon, France
 Oberursel, Germany
 Rzeszów, Poland
 Sulechów, Poland

Rustington

 Künzell, Germany
 Los Altos, United States

Rye
 Rye, United States

S

Sa–Se
Salford

 Clermont-Ferrand, France
 Lünen, Germany
 Narbonne, France
 Saint-Ouen-sur-Seine, France

Salisbury 

 Saintes, France
 Salisbury, Maryland, United States
 Salisbury, North Carolina, United States
 Xanten, Germany

Saltash
 Plougastel-Daoulas, France

Sandwell

 Amritsar, India
 Le Blanc-Mesnil, France

Sandwich

 Honfleur, France
 Ronse, Belgium
 Sonsbeck, Germany

Sawtry
 Weimar, Germany

Scarborough
 Cahir, Ireland

Scunthorpe

 Clamart, France
 Lüneburg, Germany
 Ostrowiec Świętokrzyski, Poland

Seaford

 Bönningstedt, Germany
 Crivitz, Germany

Seaham
 Gerlingen, Germany

Sedbergh
 Zreče, Slovenia

Sefton

 Gdańsk, Poland
 Mons, Belgium

Selby

 Carentan-les-Marais, France
 Filderstadt, Germany

Sevenoaks

 Pontoise, France
 Rheinbach, Germany

Sh–Sn
Shaftesbury

 Brionne, France
 Lindlar, Germany

Sheffield

 Anshan, China
 Bochum, Germany
 Chengdu, China
 Donetsk, Ukraine
 Estelí, Nicaragua
 Pittsburgh, United States

Shepshed

 Domont, France
 Kotturu, India

Shepton Mallet

 Bollnäs, Sweden
 Oissel, France

Sherborne is a member of the Douzelage, a town twinning association of towns across the European Union, alongside with:

 Agros, Cyprus
 Altea, Spain
 Asikkala, Finland
 Bad Kötzting, Germany
 Bellagio, Italy
 Bundoran, Ireland
 Chojna, Poland
 Granville, France
 Holstebro, Denmark
 Houffalize, Belgium
 Judenburg, Austria
 Kőszeg, Hungary
 Marsaskala, Malta
 Meerssen, Netherlands
 Niederanven, Luxembourg
 Oxelösund, Sweden
 Preveza, Greece
 Rokiškis, Lithuania
 Rovinj, Croatia
 Sesimbra, Portugal
 Sigulda, Latvia
 Siret, Romania
 Škofja Loka, Slovenia
 Sušice, Czech Republic
 Tryavna, Bulgaria
 Türi, Estonia
 Zvolen, Slovakia

Sheringham

 Muzillac, France
 Otterndorf, Germany

Shrivenham
 Mortrée, France

Silkstone
 Rives de l'Yon, France

Skegness
 Bad Gandersheim, Germany

Snodland
 Moyeuvre-Grande, France

So–Sp
Solihull

 Changzhou, China
 Cholet, France
 Main-Taunus (district), Germany

Somerton

 Licciana Nardi, Italy
 Sillé-le-Guillaume, France

South Ribble
 Schleswig-Flensburg (district), Germany

South Tyneside

 Épinay-sur-Seine, France
 Noisy-le-Sec, France
 Wuppertal, Germany

Southampton

 Hampton, United States
 Le Havre, France
 Miami-Dade County, United States
 Qingdao, China
 Rems-Murr (district), Germany
 Trieste, Italy

Southend-on-Sea
 Sopot, Poland

Southwark

 Clichy, France
 Langenhagen, Germany

Spalding
 Sézanne, France

Spelthorne

 Grand Port, Mauritius
 Melun, France

St
St Albans

 Fano, Italy
 Nevers, France
 Nyíregyháza, Hungary
 Odense, Denmark
 Worms, Germany

St Buryan
 Calan, France

St Erth
 Ploulec'h, France

St Germans
 Plouguerneau, France

St Helens

 Chalon-sur-Saône, France
 Stuttgart, Germany

St Ives, Cambridgeshire
 Stadtallendorf, Germany

St Ives, Cornwall

 Camaret-sur-Mer, France
 Laguna Beach, United States

St Just in Penwith
 Huelgoat, France

St Neot
 Malguénac, France

St Neots
 Faches-Thumesnil, France

Stafford

 Belfort, France
 Dreieich, Germany
 Skarżysko-Kamienna, Poland
 Stafford County, United States
 Tarragona, Spain

Stalybridge
 Armentières, France

Stamford

 Kutná Hora, Czech Republic
 Vence, France

Stapleford
 Villedômer, France

Stevenage

 Autun, France
 Ingelheim am Rhein, Germany
 Kadoma, Zimbabwe
 Shymkent, Kazakhstan

Stithians
 Ploërdut, France

Stockport

 Béziers, France 
 Heilbronn, Germany

Stockton-on-Tees
 Asnières-sur-Seine, France

Stoke-on-Trent

 East Liverpool, United States
 Erlangen, Germany

Stourport-on-Severn
 Villeneuve-le-Roi, France

Stowmarket
 Verneuil d'Avre et d'Iton, France

Stratford-upon-Avon

 Stratford (Wellington), Australia
 Stratford, Ontario, Canada
 Stratford, Prince Edward Island, Canada
 Stratford, New Zealand
 Stratford, United States

Su–Sy
Sudbury

 Clermont, France
 Fredensborg, Denmark
 Höxter, Germany

Sunderland

 Essen, Germany
 Harbin, China
 Saint-Nazaire, France
 Washington, D.C., United States

Surrey Heath

 Bietigheim-Bissingen, Germany
 Sucy-en-Brie, France

Sutton

 Charlottenburg-Wilmersdorf (Berlin), Germany
 Gagny, France
 Gladsaxe, Denmark
 Minden, Germany

Swaffham

 Hemmoor, Germany
 Valence-en-Poitou, France

Swainswick
 Cressy-sur-Somme, France

Swindon

 Ocotal, Nicaragua
 Salzgitter, Germany
 Toruń, Poland

Syston
 Déville-lès-Rouen, France

T
Tameside
 Bengbu, China

Tamworth

 Bad Laasphe, Germany
 Tamworth, Australia
 Vaujours, France

Tarporley
 Bohars, France

Tavistock

 Celle, Germany
 Pontivy, France

Tenterden
 Avallon, France

Tendring

 Biberach an der Riss, Germany
 Świdnica, Poland
 Valence, France

Thame

 Montesson, France
 Sinaia, Romania

Thetford

 Amritsar, India
 Hürth, Germany
 Nissewaard, Netherlands
 Skawina, Poland
 Les Ulis, France

Thurmaston
 Offranville, France

Thurrock

 Mönchengladbach, Germany
 Płock, Poland

Tiverton

 Chinon, France
 Hofheim am Taunus, Germany

Todmorden

 Bramsche, Germany
 Roncq, France

Tonbridge and Malling

 Heusenstamm, Germany
 Le Puy-en-Velay, France

Torbay
 Hamelin, Germany

Torpoint
 Bénodet, France

Totnes
 Vire-Normandie, France

Tower Hamlets
 Offenbach am Main, Germany

Trowbridge

 Charenton-le-Pont, France
 Elbląg, Poland
 Leer, Germany
 Oujda, Morocco

Truro

 Boppard, Germany
 Morlaix, France

Tunbridge Wells
 Wiesbaden, Germany

Twyford
 Cuincy, France

U
Uckfield

 Arques-la-Bataille, France
 Quickborn, Germany

Ulverston
 Albert, France

Upchurch
 Ferques, France

Uppingham
 Rives-en-Seine, France

V
Vale of White Horse
 Colmar, France

Verwood

 Liederbach am Taunus, Germany
 Orée-d'Anjou, France

W

Wa
Wadebridge
 Langueux, France

Wadhurst
 Aubers, France

Wakefield

 Alfeld, Germany

 Castres, France
 Castrop-Rauxel, Germany

 Hénin-Beaumont, France
 Herne, Germany
 Konin, Poland
 Xiangyang, China

Walsall

 Kobar, Palestine
 Mulhouse, France

Waltham Forest

 Antigua and Barbuda
 Dominica
 Saint-Mandé, France
 Wandsbek (Hamburg), Germany

Wantage

 Mably, France
 Seesen, Germany

Ware

 Cormeilles-en-Parisis, France
 Wülfrath, Germany

Warrington

 Červený Kostelec, Czech Republic
 Česká Skalice, Czech Republic
 Hilden, Germany 
 Hronov, Czech Republic
 Jaroměř, Czech Republic
 Náchod, Czech Republic
 Nové Město nad Metují, Czech Republic

Warwick

 Saumur, France	
 Verden an der Aller, Germany

Waterlooville

 Henstedt-Ulzburg, Germany
 Maurepas, France

Watford

 Mainz, Germany
 Nanterre, France
 Pesaro, Italy
 Veliky Novgorod, Russia
 Wilmington, United States

We–Wh
Wellingborough

 Niort, France
 Wittlich, Germany

Wellington, Shropshire
 Châtenay-Malabry, France

Wellington, Somerset
 Torres Vedras, Portugal

Wells

 Bad Dürkheim, Germany
 Fontanellato, Italy
 Paray-le-Monial, France

Welton
 Moncé-en-Belin, France

West Hendred
 Sarceaux, France

West Lancashire

 Cergy, France
 Pontoise, France
 Erkrath, Germany

Westerham
 Bonneval, France

Weston-super-Mare
 Hildesheim, Germany

Weymouth

 Holzwickede, Germany
 Louviers, France

Whaley Bridge
 Tymbark, Poland

Whitby

 Anchorage, United States
 Bland, Australia
 Cook, Australia
 East Fremantle, Australia
 Kauai County, United States
 Nukuʻalofa, Tonga
 Porirua, New Zealand
 Stanley, Falkland Islands
 Whitby, Canada
 Whitianga (Thames-Coromandel), New Zealand

Whitstable

 Albertslund, Denmark
 Borken, Germany
 Dainville, France
 Grabow, Germany
 Mölndal, Sweden
 Říčany, Czech Republic

Whitworth
 Kandel, Germany

Wi–Wo
Wigan
 Angers, France

Wilbarston
 Weinähr, Germany

Willenhall
 Drancy, France

Wimborne Minster

 Ochsenfurt, Germany
 Valognes, France

Winchester

 Giessen, Germany
 Laon, France
 Winchester, United States

Windermere
 Dießen am Ammersee, Germany

Windsor and Maidenhead

 Bad Godesberg (Bonn), Germany
 Frascati, Italy
 Goslar, Germany
 Kortrijk, Belgium
 Neuilly-sur-Seine, France
 Saint-Cloud, France

Winsford
 Deuil-la-Barre, France

Winster
 Monterubbiano, Italy

Wirksworth

 Die, France
 Frankenau, Germany

Wirral

 Gennevilliers, France

 Lorient, France
 Midland, United States
 Reno, United States
 Taicang, China

Wisbech
 Arles, France

Witney

 Le Touquet-Paris-Plage, France
 Unterhaching, Germany

Woking

 Le Plessis-Robinson, France
 Rastatt, Germany

Wokingham

 Erftstadt, Germany
 Viry-Châtillon, France

Worcester

 Kleve, Germany
 Ukmergė, Lithuania
 Le Vésinet, France
 Worcester, United States

Workington

 Selm, Germany
 Val-de-Reuil, France

Worthing

 Elzach, Germany
 Gutach im Breisgau, Germany
 Les Sables-d'Olonne, France
 Simonswald, Germany
 Waldkirch, Germany

Y
Yarm

 Schwalbach am Taunus, Germany
 Vernouillet, France

Yate
 Bad Salzdetfurth, Germany

Yeovil

 Herblay-sur-Seine, France
 Samarate, Italy
 Taunusstein, Germany

York

 Dijon, France
 Münster, Germany
 Nanjing, China

References

England
Lists of places in the United Kingdom
England
England geography-related lists
Cities in England
Populated places in England
Foreign relations of England
England-related lists